Lewis Edward Kay,  (born September 26, 1961) is a Canadian academic and biochemist known for his research in biochemistry and nuclear magnetic resonance spectroscopy for the studies of the structure and behaviour of proteins. He is a professor of molecular genetics, biochemistry and chemistry at the University of Toronto and Senior Scientist in Molecular Medicine at The Hospital for Sick Children.

Biography
Kay received a B.Sc. in Biochemistry from the University of Alberta in 1983, a Ph.D. in Molecular Biophysics from Yale University in 1988, and did post-doctoral studies at the National Institutes of Health. In 2020, he was honoured as an international member of the National Academy of Sciences.

Awards and honours

 1996 — Merck Frosst Award 
 1998 — Canada's "Top 40 under 40" 
 1999 — Steacie Prize for Natural Sciences 
 2002 — Founders Medal International Society of Magnetic Resonance in Biological Systems 
 2002 — Flavelle Medal, Royal Society of Canada
 2004 — Günther Laukien Prize
 2006 — Elected to the Royal Society of Canada
 2008 — Premier's Discovery Award 
 2010 — Elected to the Royal Society
 2012 — Khorana Prize, Royal Society of Chemistry
 2017 — Inducted as an Officer of the Order of Canada
 2017 — Gairdner Foundation International Award
 2018 — Herzberg Medal of the Natural Sciences and Engineering Research Council of Canada
 2019 — Doctor of Science honoris causa from The University of British Columbia 
 2019 — Nakanishi Prize

Personal life 
Kay is married to biophysicist Julie Forman-Kay, who studies intrinsically disordered proteins.

References

External links
Lewis E. Kay at University of Toronto

1961 births
Living people
Canadian biochemists
Fellows of the Royal Society
Fellows of the Royal Society of Canada
Officers of the Order of Canada
Scientists from Edmonton
University of Alberta alumni
Academic staff of the University of Toronto
Yale University alumni